Charles Kenston Spearman (November 3, 1891 – October 1970) was an American baseball catcher in the Negro leagues. He played from 1919 to 1929 with the Brooklyn Royal Giants, Cleveland Elites, and Lincoln Giants. Four of his brothers, Henry, Clyde, Willie, and Codie, and his son Fred also played in the Negro leagues.

References

External links
 and Baseball-Reference Black Baseball stats and Seamheads

1891 births
1970 deaths
Lincoln Giants players
Brooklyn Royal Giants players
People from Arkadelphia, Arkansas
Baseball players from Arkansas
20th-century African-American sportspeople
Baseball catchers